Al-Ashmus is a sub-district located in the Shar'ab as-Salam District, Taiz Governorate, Yemen. Al-Ashmus had a population of 2,814 according to the 2004 census.

Villages
Al-Ashmus village

References

Sub-districts in Shar'ab as-Salam District